Emmett John Scanlan (born 31 January 1979) is an Irish actor.  He is best known for playing Brendan Brady in Hollyoaks.
He appeared in the BBC Two drama The Fall in 2013 and 2014, Peaky Blinders Series 5 and Series 6, and Breakdown in which he appears alongside Craig Fairbrass, James Cosmo, Bruce Payne, Olivia Grant and Tamer Hassan. In 2022, Scanlan appeared as Marcus MacLeod in the British remake of Call My Agent!: Ten Percent.

Scanlan has acted in BBC Three's  In The Flesh series 2, and Guardians of the Galaxy.

Personal life
Scanlan married girlfriend Claire Cooper on 31 December 2015 in New York City. On 18 July 2020, she gave birth to a boy named Ocean. In October 2020, Cooper disclosed that she had miscarried her and Scanlan’s baby the previous year. On 12th of November 2022 Claire gave birth to their daughter  Scanlan has a daughter, Kayla, born September 2002 from a previous relationship. 

Scanlan is a vegan and supports PETA.

Filmography

Film

Television

Awards and nominations

(*) means there were two main rounds of nominations for that category. Shortlisted means he made it to the second and final round of voting.

References

External links

 

1979 births
Living people
Irish male film actors
Irish male television actors
Male actors from Dublin (city)
Irish male soap opera actors